Gregory Eckhardt (born January 7, 1989 in Orange Park, Florida) is an American soccer player.

Career
Eckhardt began his career with Clay County SC and joined for his Studium in 2006 to the Clemson University. He was a three-year starter for the Clemson Tigers soccer team. On February 11, 2011, he left Clemson University and signed with the Finnish Veikkausliiga club Vaasan Palloseura. On February 1, 2011, he left Finland.

Post Soccer Career
Greg works as the director of operations at Unum Insurance. He is also pursuing his executive MBA at the prestigious Fuqua school of business, Duke University.

Greg is married and resides in Chattanooga, TN.

International career
He is a former member of the United States men's national under-20 soccer team.

References

1989 births
Living people
American soccer players
Soccer players from Florida
Atlanta Silverbacks U23's players
Vaasan Palloseura players
USL League Two players
Veikkausliiga players
American expatriate soccer players
Expatriate footballers in Finland
Clemson Tigers men's soccer players
Footballers at the 2007 Pan American Games
United States men's youth international soccer players
United States men's under-20 international soccer players
People from Orange Park, Florida
Association football defenders
American expatriate sportspeople in Finland
Pan American Games competitors for the United States